Thuruthyad is a small village in Balussery panchayath. It is about 6 km away from Balussery town. Thuruthyad ALP school was the first school here. It was founded before India's independence. A special school for mentally retarded people is working here.

References

Villages in Kozhikode district
Kozhikode north